Jānis Vinters (born 19 December 1971) is a Latvian rally racing motorcycle rider and farmer.

He competed several times in the Dakar Rally, including every year until 2007 save for a two-year stretch in 2004–2005 due to injuries. In 2006, he finished in tenth place. In 2007, his last entry to date, he won two stages and ranked sixth.

References 

1971 births
Living people
Latvian motorcycle racers
Dakar Rally drivers
People from Jelgava Municipality